Moitrelia thymiella is a species of snout moth. It is found in Italy and Turkey.

References

Moths described in 1846
Phycitini
Moths of Asia
Moths of Europe